Manganese disilicide (MnSi2) is an intermetallic compound, a silicide of manganese. It is a non-stoichiometric compound, with a silicon deficiency expressed as MnSi2–x. Crystal structures of many MnSi2–x compounds resemble a chimney ladder and are called Nowotny phases. They include 
MnSi2 (x=0), Mn4Si7 (x=0.250), Mn11Si19 (x=0.273), Mn15Si26 (x=0.267) and Mn27Si47 (x=0.259). These phases have very similar unit cells whose length varies from 1.75 nm for MnSi2 or Mn4Si7, which have almost the same structures, to 11.8 nm for Mn27Si47. 

MnSi2–x Nowotny phases have a Mn sublattice with a β-tin structure overlaid with a face-centered cubic Si sublattice. They resemble chimneys of transition metal atoms containing spiraling ladders of Si. These phases are semiconductors with a band gap of 0.4 to 0.9 eV. They exhibit a reasonably high thermoelectric figure of merit ZT ~ 0.8 and have potential applications in thermoelectric generators.

References

Manganese compounds
Transition metal silicides